Gaysorn Thavat is a New Zealand film director.

Biography 
Thavat's first job in the film industry was as a clapper loader, in 1995, and she worked her way up to assistant camera operator. In 2004 she began directing television commercials and in 2009 she won a Gold Lion award for a breast cancer commercial. She later moved into directing episodic television and films and in 2009 she directed her first short film, Brave Donkey.

Filmography

References 

Living people
New Zealand film directors
Year of birth missing (living people)